Ricardo Torres Balaguer (Llíria, Valencia Province, 13 February 1955) is a Spanish politician and former deputy who belongs to the governing Spanish Socialist Workers' Party (PSOE).

After qualifying in law and economic science, Torres served as Mayor of his hometown of Llíria from 1991 to 1995. In 2004 he was elected to the Congress of Deputies as a deputy for Valencia region and served as Economic and Manufacturing spokesman for the PSOE group. During his time as deputy he was criticised   for possible conflict of interest. He did not stand at the 2008 election.

External links
 Biography at Spanish Congress website

1955 births
Living people
People from Camp de Túria
Members of the 8th Congress of Deputies (Spain)
Politicians from the Valencian Community
Spanish Socialist Workers' Party politicians